Ewald Menzl (born July 12, 1908, date of death unknown) was a bobsledder who competed for Czechoslovakia in the mid-1930s. At the 1936 Winter Olympics in Garmisch-Partenkirchen, he was listed in the four-man event, but did not compete.

References
 1936 bobsleigh four-man results
 1936 Olympic Winter Games official report. - p. 415.
 Ewald Menzl's profile at Sports Reference.com

Olympic bobsledders of Czechoslovakia
Bobsledders at the 1936 Winter Olympics
Czechoslovak male bobsledders
Year of death missing
1908 births